Abdalla Sabdi (also spelled  or  and in short form) is a Somali clan, and subclan of Murusade which is part of the major Hawiye clan. Its members live in Banaadir, Galgaduud and Lower Shebelle.

Clan tree

Members of the Abdalle Sabdi Subclan preserved their lineage and is as follows. Some lineages are also omitted.
Hawiye
Karanle
Murusade
Sabdi 
Cabdalle Sabdi
Absuge
Mohamed Yar
Mohamud Faqey
Musse Fareey
Ambarey (Cambarey)
Ilka Gagaduud
Guuleed Cad
Muuse Gureey
 Baane ( Hadow , iidle , Rooble , Ahmed , Mohamoud )
Hareed (Xareed)
Gadiid

Prominent members of Abdalla Sabdi clan
 Abdulkadir Yahya Ali, A renowned peace activist.
 Mohamed Moallim Hassan, a politician who served as the minister of fishery and marine resources of the Transitional Federal Government (TFG) of Somalia from 12 November 2010 to 19 June 2011.
 Mohamed Nur Ga'al, a politician who served as  Minister of state for foreign affairs under prime minister Abdi Farah Shirdon December 2012 to December 2013. Ga'al has also been the Galmudug Parlimant speaker since January 17, 2020.  
 Mariam Arif Gassim, member of Somali parliament since 2000. She is  the author of the books "Somalia: clan vs. nation" and "Hostages: The people who kidnapped themselves" Maryam is also a  business woman and hotelier.
 Herei Gassim Wehelie, One of the Somalia's most popular businessmen in the pre-civil war era running the famous soup and detergent factory in Mogadishu which was known as Bail. A Well known politician who served as governor and district commissioner in several provinces in Somalia in 1960s  and also served as the minister of housing and urban development in the self-proclaimed government of Mohamed Farrah Aidid 1995-1996 
 Elian Yahye, A Young Somali Dutch activist and current Netherland youth representative for the United Nations.

Abdulkadir Mohamed Mohamud, Also known as Caanaboore (Anabore), the deputy mayor and deputy governor of Banaadir regional administration since November 14, 2020.

References

Ethnic groups in Somalia
Muslim communities in Africa
Somali clans